Galgula subapicalis is a moth of the family Noctuidae. It is found on Jamaica.

References

Hadeninae
Moths described in 1909
Moths of the Caribbean
Taxa named by George Hampson